Nathan ( Nāṯān, "Given"; fl.  BC) is a prophet in the Hebrew Bible. His actions are described in the Books of Samuel, Kings, and Chronicles (especially).

Biblical accounts

Nathan was a court prophet in the time of King David. Nathan then announces to David the covenant God was making with him (a passage known as Nathan's Oracle), contrasting David's proposal to build a house (i.e. a building) for the Ark with God's plan to build a house (i.e. a dynasty) for David. Later, he comes to David to reprimand him for committing adultery with Bathsheba while she was the wife of Uriah the Hittite, whose death the King had also arranged to hide his previous transgression.

According to Chronicles, Nathan wrote histories of the reigns of both David and Solomon, and was involved in the music of the temple (see ).

In  it is Nathan who tells the dying David of the plot of Adonijah to become king, resulting in Solomon being proclaimed king instead. Nathan presides at the anointing of King Solomon. The Midrash teaches that two honorary seats flanked the throne of King Solomon, one for Nathan and the other for Gad the Seer.

A lost Book of Nathan the Prophet is mentioned in 1 and 2 Chronicles. Although the work appears to have been lost, some speculate that some of its content have been incorporated into the books of Samuel or Kings.

Feast day

In the Eastern Orthodox Church, and those Eastern Catholic Churches which follow the Byzantine Rite, he is commemorated as a saint on the Sunday of the Holy Fathers (i.e., the Sunday before the Great Feast of the Nativity of the Lord). According to the Orthodox Church in America website, the Prophet Nathan is commemorated on December 14.

As a name
 

Derived from this biblical character, "Nathan" is used as a male first name in various languages.

See also
Nathan (son of David)

References

10th-century BCE Hebrew people
11th-century BCE Hebrew people
Christian saints from the Old Testament
People associated with David
10th-century BC religious leaders